This is a list of the bird species recorded in Iceland. The avifauna of Iceland included a total of 418 confirmed species as of October 2022 according to the Icelandic Birding Pages (IBP) with supplemental additions from Avibase. The entire populations of two species have resulted from introductions by humans, and a few other species have individuals of both natural and human-assisted origin. One species on the list is extinct.

This list's taxonomic treatment (designation and sequence of orders, families and species) and nomenclature (English and scientific names) are those of The Clements Checklist of Birds of the World, 2022 edition. 

The following tags have been used to highlight some categories of occurrence.

(A) Accidental - a species that rarely or accidentally occurs in Iceland
(I) Introduced - a species introduced to Iceland as a consequence, direct or indirect, of human actions, and has become established

Ducks, geese, and waterfowl
Order: AnseriformesFamily: Anatidae

Anatidae includes the ducks and most duck-like waterfowl, such as geese and swans. These birds are adapted to an aquatic existence with webbed feet, flattened bills, and feathers that are excellent at shedding water due to an oily coating.

Bar-headed goose, Anser indicus (A)
Snow goose, Anser caerulescens (A)
Ross's goose, Anser rossii (A)
Graylag goose, Anser anser
Greater white-fronted goose, Anser albifrons
Tundra bean-goose, Anser serrirostris (A) 
Pink-footed goose, Anser brachyrhynchus
Brant, Branta bernicla
Barnacle goose, Branta leucopsis
Cackling goose, Branta hutchinsii (A)
Canada goose, Branta canadensis (A)
Red-breasted goose, Branta ruficollis (A)
Mute swan, Cygnus olor (A)
Tundra swan, Cygnus columbianus (A)
Whooper swan, Cygnus cygnus
Ruddy shelduck, Tadorna ferruginea (A)
Common shelduck, Tadorna tadorna (A)
Wood duck, Aix sponsa (A)
Mandarin duck, Aix galericulata (A) (I)
Garganey, Spatula querquedula (A)
Blue-winged teal, Spatula discors (A)
Northern shoveler, Spatula clypeata (A)
Gadwall, Mareca strepera
Eurasian wigeon, Mareca penelope
American wigeon, Mareca americana (A)
Mallard, Anas platyrhynchos
American black duck, Anas rubripes (A)
Northern pintail, Anas acuta
Green-winged teal, Anas crecca
Canvasback, Aythya valisineria (A)
Redhead, Aythya americana (A)
Common pochard, Aythya ferina (A)
Ring-necked duck, Aythya collaris (A)
Ferruginous duck, Aythya nyroca (A)
Tufted duck, Aythya fuligula
Greater scaup, Aythya marila
Lesser scaup, Aythya affinis (A)
Steller's eider, Polysticta stelleri (A)
King eider, Somateria spectabilis (A)
Common eider, Somateria mollissima
Harlequin duck, Histrionicus histrionicus
Surf scoter, Melanitta perspicillata (A)
Velvet scoter, Melanitta fusca (A)
White-winged scoter, Melanitta deglandi (A)
Stejneger's scoter, Melanitta stejnegeri (A)
Common scoter, Melanitta nigra
Black scoter, Melanitta americana (A)
Long-tailed duck, Clangula hyemalis
Bufflehead, Bucephala albeola (A)
Common goldeneye, Bucephala clangula (A)
Barrow's goldeneye, Bucephala islandica
Smew, Mergellus albellus (A)
Hooded merganser, Lophodytes cucullatus (A)
Common merganser, Mergus merganser
Red-breasted merganser, Mergus serrator
Ruddy duck, Oxyura jamaicensis (A) (I)

Pheasants, grouse, and allies
Order: GalliformesFamily: Phasianidae

These are terrestrial species of gamebirds, feeding and nesting on the ground. They are variable in size but generally plump, with broad and relatively short wings. 

Rock ptarmigan, Lagopus muta
Common quail, Coturnix coturnix (A)

Grebes
Order: PodicipediformesFamily: Podicipedidae

Grebes are small to medium-large freshwater diving birds. They have lobed toes and are excellent swimmers and divers. However, they have their feet placed far back on the body, making them quite ungainly on land.

Little grebe, Tachybaptus ruficollis (A)
Pied-billed grebe, Podilymbus podiceps (A)
Horned grebe, Podiceps auritus
Red-necked grebe, Podiceps grisegena (A)
Great crested grebe, Podiceps cristatus (A)

Pigeons and doves
Order: ColumbiformesFamily: Columbidae

Pigeons and doves are stout-bodied birds with short necks and short slender bills with a fleshy cere.

Rock pigeon, Columba livia
Stock dove, Columba oenas (A)
Common wood-pigeon, Columba palumbus (A)
European turtle-dove, Streptopelia turtur (A)
Eurasian collared-dove, Streptopelia decaocto (A)
Mourning dove, Zenaida macroura (A)

Cuckoos
Order: CuculiformesFamily: Cuculidae

The family Cuculidae includes cuckoos, roadrunners, and anis. These birds are of variable size with slender bodies, long tails, and strong legs. The Old World cuckoos are brood parasites.

Yellow-billed cuckoo, Coccyzus americanus (A)
Black-billed cuckoo, Coccyzus erythropthalmus (A)
Common cuckoo, Cuculus canorus (A)

Nightjars and allies
Order: CaprimulgiformesFamily: Caprimulgidae

Nightjars are medium-sized nocturnal birds that usually nest on the ground. They have long wings, short legs, and very short bills. Most have small feet, of little use for walking, and long pointed wings. Their soft plumage is camouflaged to resemble bark or leaves.

Common nighthawk, Chordeiles minor (A)
Eurasian nightjar, Caprimulgus europaeus (A)

Swifts
Order: CaprimulgiformesFamily: Apodidae

Swifts are small birds which spend the majority of their lives flying. These birds have very short legs and never settle voluntarily on the ground, perching instead only on vertical surfaces. Many swifts have long swept-back wings which resemble a crescent or boomerang.

White-throated needletail, Hirundapus caudacutus (A)
Alpine swift, Apus melba (A)
Common swift, Apus apus (A)
Pacific swift, Apus pacificus (A)

Rails, gallinules, and coots
Order: GruiformesFamily: Rallidae

Rallidae is a large family of small to medium-sized birds which includes the rails, crakes, coots, and gallinules. Typically they inhabit dense vegetation in damp environments near lakes, swamps, or rivers. In general they are shy and secretive birds, making them difficult to observe. Most species have strong legs and long toes which are well adapted to soft uneven surfaces. They tend to have short, rounded wings and to be weak fliers.

Water rail, Rallus aquaticus (A)
Corn crake, Crex crex (A)
Sora, Porzana carolina (A)
Spotted crake, Porzana porzana (A)
Eurasian moorhen, Gallinula chloropus (A)
Eurasian coot, Fulica atra (A)
American coot, Fulica americana (A)
Purple gallinule, Porphyrio martinicus (A)

Cranes
Order: GruiformesFamily: Gruidae

Cranes are large, long-legged, and long-necked birds. Unlike the similar-looking but unrelated herons, cranes fly with necks outstretched, not pulled back. Most have elaborate and noisy courting displays or "dances".

Common crane, Grus grus (A)

Thick-knees
Order: CharadriiformesFamily: Burhinidae

The thick-knees are a group of waders found worldwide within the tropical zone, with some species also breeding in temperate Europe and Australia. They are medium to large waders with strong black or yellow-black bills, large yellow eyes, and cryptic plumage. Despite being classed as waders, most species have a preference for arid or semi-arid habitats.

Eurasian thick-knee, Burhinus oedicnemus (A)

Stilts and avocets
Order: CharadriiformesFamily: Recurvirostridae

Recurvirostridae is a family of large wading birds which includes the avocets and stilts. The avocets have long legs and long up-curved bills. The stilts have extremely long legs and long, thin, straight bills.

Black-winged stilt, 	Himantopus himantopus (A)
Pied avocet, Recurvirostra avosetta (A)

Oystercatchers
Order: CharadriiformesFamily: Haematopodidae

The oystercatchers are large and noisy plover-like birds, with strong bills used for smashing or prising open molluscs.

Eurasian oystercatcher, Haematopus ostralegus

Plovers and lapwings
Order: CharadriiformesFamily: Charadriidae

The family Charadriidae includes the plovers, dotterels, and lapwings. They are small to medium-sized birds with compact bodies, short thick necks, and long, usually pointed, wings. They are found in open country worldwide, mostly in habitats near water.

Black-bellied plover, Pluvialis squatarola (A)
European golden-plover, Pluvialis apricaria
American golden-plover, Pluvialis dominica (A)
Pacific golden-plover, Pluvialis fulva (A)
Northern lapwing, Vanellus vanellus (A)
Greater sand-plover, Charadrius leschenaultii (A)
Common ringed plover, Charadrius hiaticula
Semipalmated plover, Charadrius semipalmatus
Little ringed plover, Charadrius dubius (A)
Killdeer, Charadrius vociferus (A)
Eurasian dotterel, Charadrius morinellus (A)

Sandpipers and allies
Order: CharadriiformesFamily: Scolopacidae

Scolopacidae is a large diverse family of small to medium-sized shorebirds including the sandpipers, curlews, godwits, shanks, tattlers, woodcocks, snipes, dowitchers, and phalaropes. The majority of these species eat small invertebrates picked out of the mud or soil. Variation in length of legs and bills enables multiple species to feed in the same habitat, particularly on the coast, without direct competition for food. 

Upland sandpiper, Bartramia longicauda (A)
Whimbrel, Numenius phaeopus
Eurasian curlew, Numenius arquata (A)
Bar-tailed godwit, Limosa lapponica (A)
Black-tailed godwit, Limosa limosa
Ruddy turnstone, Arenaria interpres
Great knot, Calidris tenuirostris (A)
Red knot, Calidris canutus
Ruff, Calidris pugnax (A)
Broad-billed sandpiper, Calidris falcinellus (A)
Stilt sandpiper, Calidris himantopus (A)
Curlew sandpiper, Calidris ferruginea (A)
Temminck's stint, Calidris temminckii (A)
Red-necked stint, Calidris ruficollis (A)
Sanderling, Calidris alba
Dunlin, Calidris alpina
Purple sandpiper, Calidris maritima
Baird's sandpiper, Calidris bairdii (A)
Little stint, Calidris minuta (A)
Least sandpiper, Calidris minutilla (A)
White-rumped sandpiper, Calidris fuscicollis (A)
Buff-breasted sandpiper, Calidris subruficollis (A)
Pectoral sandpiper, Calidris melanotos (A)
Semipalmated sandpiper, Calidris pusilla (A)
Western sandpiper, Calidris mauri (A)
Short-billed dowitcher, Limnodromus griseus (A)
Long-billed dowitcher, Limnodromus scolopaceus (A)
Jack snipe, Lymnocryptes minimus (A)
Eurasian woodcock, Scolopax rusticola (A)
Common snipe, Gallinago gallinago
Wilson's snipe, Gallinago delicata (A)
Wilson's phalarope, Phalaropus tricolor (A)
Red-necked phalarope, Phalaropus lobatus
Red phalarope, Phalaropus fulicarius
Common sandpiper, Actitis hypoleucos (A)
Spotted sandpiper, Actitis macularia (A)
Green sandpiper, Tringa ochropus (A)
Solitary sandpiper, Tringa solitaria (A)
Grey-tailed tattler, Tringa brevipes (A)
Spotted redshank, Tringa erythropus (A)
Greater yellowlegs, Tringa melanoleuca (A)
Common greenshank, Tringa nebularia (A)
Lesser yellowlegs, Tringa flavipes (A)
Wood sandpiper, Tringa glareola (A)
Common redshank, Tringa totanus

Pratincoles and coursers
Order: CharadriiformesFamily: Glareolidae

Glareolidae is a family of wading birds comprising the pratincoles, which have short legs, long pointed wings, and long forked tails, and the coursers, which have long legs, short wings, and long, pointed bills which curve downwards.

Collared pratincole, Glareola pratincola (A)
Black-winged pratincole, Glareola nordmanni (A)

Skuas and jaegers
Order: CharadriiformesFamily: Stercorariidae

The family Stercorariidae are, in general, medium to large sea birds, typically with gray or brown plumage, often with white markings on the wings. They nest on the ground in temperate and arctic regions and are long-distance migrants. 

Great skua, Stercorarius skua
Pomarine jaeger, Stercorarius pomarinus (A)
Parasitic jaeger, Stercorarius parasiticus
Long-tailed jaeger, Stercorarius longicaudus (A)

Auks, murres, and puffins
Order: CharadriiformesFamily: Alcidae

Alcidae are a family of seabirds which are superficially similar to penguins with their black-and-white colors, their upright posture, and some of their habits, but which are able to fly.

Dovekie, Alle alle
Common murre, Uria aalge
Thick-billed murre, Uria lomvia
Razorbill, Alca torda
Great auk, Pinguinus impennis (extinct)
Black guillemot, Cepphus grylle
Crested auklet, Aethia cristatella (A)
Atlantic puffin, Fratercula arctica

Gulls, terns, and skimmers
Order: CharadriiformesFamily: Laridae

Laridae is a family of medium to large seabirds and includes gulls, terns, and skimmers. Gulls are typically gray or white, often with black markings on the head or wings. They have stout, longish, bills and webbed feet. Terns are a group of generally medium to large seabirds typically with gray or white plumage, often with black markings on the head. Most terns hunt fish by diving but some pick insects off the surface of fresh water. Terns are generally long-lived birds, with several species known to live in excess of 30 years.

Black-legged kittiwake, Rissa tridactyla
Ivory gull, Pagophila eburnea (A) 
Sabine's gull, Xema sabini (A)
Bonaparte's gull, Chroicocephalus philadelphia (A)
Black-headed gull, Chroicocephalus ridibundus
Little gull, Hydrocoloeus minutus (A)
Ross's gull, Rhodostethia rosea (A)
Laughing gull, Leucophaeus atricilla (A)
Franklin's gull, Leucophaeus pipixcan (A)
Mediterranean gull, Ichthyaetus melanocephalus (A)
Common gull, Larus canus
Ring-billed gull, Larus delawarensis (A)
Herring gull, Larus argentatus
Yellow-legged gull, Larus michahellis (A)
Caspian gull, Larus cachinnans (A)
Iceland gull, Larus glaucoides
Lesser black-backed gull, Larus fuscus
Slaty-backed gull, Larus schistisagus (A)
Glaucous-winged gull, Larus glaucescens (A)
Glaucous gull, Larus hyperboreus
Great black-backed gull, Larus marinus
Sooty tern, Onychoprion fuscatus (A)
Little tern, Sternula albifrons (A)
Gull-billed tern, Gelochelidon nilotica (A)
Caspian tern, Hydroprogne caspia (A)
Black tern, Chlidonias niger (A)
White-winged tern, Chlidonias leucopterus (A)
Whiskered tern, Chlidonias hybrida (A)
Roseate tern, Sterna dougallii (A)
Common tern, Sterna hirundo (A)
Arctic tern, Sterna paradisaea
Forster's tern, Sterna forsteri (A)
Sandwich tern, Thalasseus sandvicensis (A)

Loons
Order: GaviiformesFamily: Gaviidae

Loons are a group of aquatic birds found in many parts of North America and Northern Europe. They are the size of a large duck or small goose, which they somewhat resemble in shape when swimming, but to which they are completely unrelated. In particular, loons' legs are set very far back which assists swimming underwater but makes walking on land extremely difficult. 

Red-throated loon, Gavia stellata
Arctic loon, Gavia arctica (A)
Common loon, Gavia immer
Yellow-billed loon, Gavia adamsii (A)

Albatrosses
Order: ProcellariiformesFamily: Diomedeidae

The albatrosses are among the largest of flying birds, and the great albatrosses of the genus Diomedea have the largest wingspans of any extant birds.

Yellow-nosed albatross, Thalassarche chlororhynchos (A)
Black-browed albatross, Thalassarche melanophris (A)

Southern storm-petrels
Order: ProcellariiformesFamily: Oceanitidae

The southern storm-petrels are relatives of the petrels and are the smallest seabirds. They feed on planktonic crustaceans and small fish picked from the surface, typically while hovering.

Wilson's storm-petrel, Oceanites oceanicus (A)

Northern storm-petrels
Order: ProcellariiformesFamily: Hydrobatidae

Though the members of this family are similar in many respects to the southern storm-petrels, including their general appearance and habits, there are enough genetic differences to warrant their placement in a separate family. 

European storm-petrel, Hydrobates pelagicus
Leach's storm-petrel, Hydrobates leucorhous

Shearwaters and petrels
Order: ProcellariiformesFamily: Procellariidae

The procellariids are the main group of medium-sized "true petrels", characterised by united nostrils with medium septum and a long outer functional primary.

Northern fulmar, Fulmarus glacialis
Great shearwater, Ardenna gravis (A)
Sooty shearwater, Ardenna griseus (A)
Manx shearwater, Puffinus puffinus

Storks
Order: CiconiiformesFamily: Ciconiidae

Storks are large, long-legged, long-necked, wading birds with long, stout bills. Storks are mute, but bill-clattering is an important mode of communication at the nest. Their nests can be large and may be reused for many years. Many species are migratory.

Black stork, Ciconia nigra (A)
White stork, Ciconia ciconia (A)

Boobies and gannets
Order: SuliformesFamily: Sulidae

The sulids comprise the gannets and boobies. Both groups are medium-large coastal seabirds that plunge-dive for fish.

Northern gannet, Morus bassanus

Cormorants and shags
Order: SuliformesFamily: Phalacrocoracidae

Cormorants and shags are medium-to-large aquatic birds, usually with mainly dark plumage and areas of colored skin on the face. The bill is long, thin and sharply hooked. Their feet are four-toed and webbed.

Great cormorant, Phalacrocorax carbo
European shag, Gulosus aristotelis

Herons, egrets, and bitterns
Order: PelecaniformesFamily: Ardeidae

The family Ardeidae contains the herons, egrets, and bitterns. Herons and egrets are medium to large wading birds with long necks and legs. Bitterns tend to be shorter necked and more secretive. Members of Ardeidae fly with their necks retracted, unlike other long-necked birds such as storks, ibises and spoonbills.

American bittern, Botaurus lentiginosus (A)
Great bittern, Botaurus stellaris (A)
Little bittern, Ixobrychus minutus (A)
Least bittern, Ixobrychus exilis (A)
Great blue heron, Ardea herodias (A)
Gray heron, Ardea cinerea (A)
Purple heron, Ardea purpurea (A)
Great egret, Ardea alba (A)
Little egret, Egretta garzetta (A)
Snowy egret, Egretta thula (A)
Cattle egret, Bubulcus ibis (A)
Squacco heron, Ardeola ralloides (A)
Green heron, Butorides virescens (A)
Striated heron, Butorides striata (A)
Black-crowned night-heron, Nycticorax nycticorax (A)

Ibises and spoonbills
Order: PelecaniformesFamily: Threskiornithidae

The family Threskiornithidae includes the ibises and spoonbills. They have long, broad wings. Their bodies tend to be elongated, the neck more so, with rather long legs. The bill is also long, decurved in the case of the ibises, straight and distinctively flattened in the spoonbills.

Glossy ibis, Plegadis falcinellus (A)
Eurasian spoonbill, Platalea leucorodia (A)

Osprey
Order: AccipitriformesFamily: Pandionidae

Pandionidae is a family of fish-eating birds of prey, possessing a very large, powerful hooked beak for tearing flesh from their prey, strong legs, powerful talons, and keen eyesight. The family is monotypic.

Osprey, Pandion haliaetus (A)

Hawks, eagles, and kites
Order: AccipitriformesFamily: Accipitridae

Accipitridae is a family of birds of prey and includes hawks, eagles, kites, harriers, and Old World vultures. These birds have very large powerful hooked beaks for tearing flesh from their prey, strong legs, powerful talons, and keen eyesight.

European honey-buzzard, Pernis apivorus (A)
Booted eagle, Hieraaetus pennatus (A)
Eurasian marsh-harrier, Circus aeruginosus (A)
Hen harrier, Circus cyaneus (A)
Northern harrier, Circus hudsonius (A)
Pallid harrier, Circus macrourus (A)
Montagu's harrier, Circus pygargus (A)
Eurasian sparrowhawk, Accipiter nisus (A)
Red kite, Milvus milvus (A) 
Black kite, Milvus migrans (A)
White-tailed eagle, Haliaeetus albicilla
Rough-legged hawk, Buteo lagopus (A)
Common buzzard, Buteo buteo (A)

Owls
Order: StrigiformesFamily: Strigidae

Typical owls are small to large solitary nocturnal birds of prey. They have large forward-facing eyes and ears, a hawk-like beak, and a conspicuous circle of feathers around each eye called a facial disk.

Eurasian scops-owl, Otus scops (A)
Snowy owl, Bubo scandiacus (A)
Long-eared owl, Asio otus (A)
Short-eared owl, Asio flammeus

Hoopoes
Order: BucerotiformesFamily: Upupidae

Hoopoes have black, white and orangey-pink colouring with a large erectile crest on their head.

Eurasian hoopoe, Upupa epops (A)

Kingfishers
Order: CoraciiformesFamily: Alcedinidae

Kingfishers are medium-sized birds with large heads, long, pointed bills, short legs and stubby tails.

Common kingfisher, Alcedo atthis (A)
Belted kingfisher, Ceryle alcyon (A)

Bee-eaters
Order: CoraciiformesFamily: Meropidae

The bee-eaters are a group of near passerine birds in the family Meropidae. Most species are found in Africa but others occur in southern Europe, Madagascar, Australia and New Guinea. They are characterised by richly coloured plumage, slender bodies and usually elongated central tail feathers. All are colourful and have long downturned bills and pointed wings, which give them a swallow-like appearance when seen from afar.

European bee-eater, Merops apiaster (A)

Rollers
Order: CoraciiformesFamily: Coraciidae

Rollers resemble crows in size and build, but are more closely related to the kingfishers and bee-eaters. They share the colourful appearance of those groups with blues and browns predominating. The two inner front toes are connected, but the outer toe is not.

European roller, Coracias garrulus (A)

Woodpeckers
Order: PiciformesFamily: Picidae

Woodpeckers are small to medium-sized birds with chisel-like beaks, short legs, stiff tails and long tongues used for capturing insects. Some species have feet with two toes pointing forward and two backward, while several species have only three toes. Many woodpeckers have the habit of tapping noisily on tree trunks with their beaks.

Eurasian wryneck, Jynx torquilla (A)
Yellow-bellied sapsucker, Sphyrapicus varius (A)
Great spotted woodpecker, Dendrocopos major (A)

Falcons and caracaras
Order: FalconiformesFamily: Falconidae

Falconidae is a family of diurnal birds of prey. They differ from hawks, eagles and kites in that they kill with their beaks instead of their talons.

Eurasian kestrel, Falco tinnunculus (A)
Red-footed falcon, Falco vespertinus (A)
Merlin, Falco columbarius
Eurasian hobby, Falco subbuteo (A)
Gyrfalcon, Falco rusticolus
Peregrine falcon, Falco peregrinus (A)

Tyrant flycatchers
Order: PasseriformesFamily: Tyrannidae

Tyrant flycatchers are Passerine birds which occur throughout North and South America. They superficially resemble the Old World flycatchers, but are more robust and have stronger bills. They do not have the sophisticated vocal capabilities of the songbirds. Most, but not all, are rather plain. As the name implies, most are insectivorous.

Acadian flycatcher, Empidonax virescens (A)
Alder flycatcher, Empidonax alnorum (A)
Least flycatcher, Empidonax minimus (A)
Eastern kingbird, Tyrannus tyrannus (A)

Vireos, shrike-babblers, and erpornis
Order: PasseriformesFamily: Vireonidae

The vireos are a group of small to medium-sized passerine birds. They are typically greenish in color and resemble wood warblers apart from their heavier bills.

Red-eyed vireo, Vireo olivaceus (A)

Old World orioles
Order: PasseriformesFamily: Oriolidae

The Old World orioles are colourful passerine birds. They are not related to the New World orioles.

Eurasian golden oriole, Oriolus oriolus (A)

Shrikes
Order: PasseriformesFamily: Laniidae

Shrikes are passerine birds known for their habit of catching other birds and small animals and impaling the uneaten portions of their bodies on thorns. A shrike's beak is hooked, like that of a typical bird of prey. 

Red-backed shrike, Lanius collurio (A)
Red-tailed shrike, Lanius phoenicuroides (A)
Isabelline shrike, Lanius isabellinus (A)
Great gray shrike, Lanius excubitor (A)
Woodchat shrike, Lanius senator (A)

Crows, jays, and magpies
Order: PasseriformesFamily: Corvidae

The family Corvidae includes crows, ravens, jays, choughs, magpies, treepies, nutcrackers, and ground jays. Corvids are above average in size among the Passeriformes, and some of the larger species show high levels of intelligence.

Eurasian jackdaw, Corvus monedula (A)
Rook, Corvus frugilegus (A)
Hooded crow, Corvus cornix (A)
Common raven, Corvus corax

Tits, chickadees, and titmice
Order: PasseriformesFamily: Paridae

The Paridae are mainly small stocky woodland species with short stout bills. Some have crests. They are adaptable birds, with a mixed diet including seeds and insects.

Great tit, Parus major (A)

Larks
Order: PasseriformesFamily: Alaudidae

Larks are small terrestrial birds with often extravagant songs and display flights. Most larks are fairly dull in appearance. Their food is insects and seeds.

Horned lark, Eremophila alpestris (A)
Greater short-toed lark, Calandrella brachydactyla (A)
Eurasian skylark, Alauda arvensis (A)

Reed warblers and allies
Order: PasseriformesFamily: Acrocephalidae

The members of this family are usually rather large for "warblers". Most are rather plain olivaceous brown above with much yellow to beige below. They are usually found in open woodland, reedbeds, or tall grass. The family occurs mostly in southern to western Eurasia and surroundings, but it also ranges far into the Pacific, with some species in Africa.

Booted warbler, Iduna caligata (A)
Sykes's warbler, Iduna rama (A)
Eastern olivaceous warbler, Iduna pallida (A)
Melodious warbler, Hippolais polyglotta (A)
Icterine warbler, Hippolais icterina (A)
Sedge warbler, Acrocephalus schoenobaenus (A)
Paddyfield warbler, Acrocephalus agricola (A)
Blyth's reed warbler, Acrocephalus dumetorum (A)
Marsh warbler, Acrocephalus palustris (A)
Eurasian reed warbler, Acrocephalus scirpaceus (A)

Grassbirds and allies
Order: PasseriformesFamily: Locustellidae

Locustellidae are a family of small insectivorous songbirds found mainly in Eurasia, Africa, and the Australian region. They are smallish birds with tails that are usually long and pointed, and tend to be drab brownish or buffy all over.

Lanceolated warbler, Locustella lanceolata (A)
River warbler, Locustella fluviatilis (A)
Common grasshopper-warbler, Locustella naevia (A)

Swallows
Order: PasseriformesFamily: Hirundinidae

The family Hirundinidae is adapted to aerial feeding. They have a slender streamlined body, long pointed wings, and a short bill with a wide gape. The feet are adapted to perching rather than walking, and the front toes are partially joined at the base.

Tree swallow, Tachycineta bicolor (A)
Bank swallow, Riparia riparia (A)
Barn swallow, Hirundo rustica (A)
Red-rumped swallow, Cecropis daurica (A)
Cliff swallow, Petrochelidon pyrrhonota (A)
Common house-martin, Delichon urbicum (A)

Leaf warblers
Order: PasseriformesFamily: Phylloscopidae

Leaf warblers are a family of small insectivorous birds found mostly in Eurasia and ranging into Wallacea and Africa. The species are of various sizes, often green-plumaged above and yellow below, or more subdued with grayish-green to grayish-brown colors.

Wood warbler, Phylloscopus sibilatrix (A)
Yellow-browed warbler, Phylloscopus inornatus (A)
Hume's warbler, Phylloscopus humei (A)
Dusky warbler, Phylloscopus fuscatus (A)
Willow warbler, Phylloscopus trochilus (A)
Common chiffchaff, Phylloscopus collybita (A)
Arctic warbler, Phylloscopus borealis (A)

Sylviid warblers, parrotbills, and allies
Order: PasseriformesFamily: Sylviidae

The family Sylviidae is a group of small insectivorous birds. They mainly occur as breeding species, as another common name (Old World warblers) implies, in Europe, Asia and, to a lesser extent, Africa. Most are of generally undistinguished appearance, but many have distinctive songs.

Eurasian blackcap, Sylvia atricapilla (A)
Garden warbler, Sylvia borin (A)
Barred warbler, Curruca nisoria (A)
Lesser whitethroat, Curruca curruca (A)
Western subalpine warbler, Curruca iberiae (A)
Eastern subalpine warbler, Curruca cantillans (A)
Greater whitethroat, Curruca communis (A)

Kinglets
Order: PasseriformesFamily: Regulidae

The kinglets and "crests" are a small family of birds which resemble some warblers. They are very small insectivorous birds in the single genus Regulus. The adults have colored crowns, giving rise to their name.

Ruby-crowned kinglet, Regulus calendula (A)
Goldcrest, Regulus regulus

Nuthatches
Order: PasseriformesFamily: Sittidae

Nuthatches are small woodland birds. They have the unusual ability to climb down trees head first, unlike other birds which can only go upwards. Nuthatches have big heads, short tails, and powerful bills and feet.

Red-breasted nuthatch, Sitta canadensis (A)

Wrens
Order: PasseriformesFamily: Troglodytidae

The wrens are mainly small and inconspicuous except for their loud songs. These birds have short wings and thin down-turned bills. Several species often hold their tails upright. All are insectivorous.

Eurasian wren, Troglodytes troglodytes

Starlings
Order: PasseriformesFamily: Sturnidae

Starlings are small to medium-sized passerine birds. Their flight is strong and direct and they are very gregarious. Their preferred habitat is fairly open country. They eat insects and fruit. Their plumage is typically dark with a metallic sheen.

European starling, Sturnus vulgaris
Rosy starling, Pastor roseus (A)

Thrushes and allies
Order: PasseriformesFamily: Turdidae

The thrushes are a family of birds that occur mainly in the Old World. They are plump, soft-plumaged, small-to-medium-sized insectivores or sometimes omnivores, often feeding on the ground. Many have attractive songs. 

White's thrush, Zoothera aurea (A)
Scaly thrush, Zoothera dauma (A)
Varied thrush, Ixoreus naevius (A)
Gray-cheeked thrush, Catharus minimus (A)
Swainson's thrush, Catharus ustulatus (A)
Hermit thrush, Catharus guttatus (A)
Wood thrush, Hylocichla mustelina (A)
Mistle thrush, Turdus viscivorus (A)
Song thrush, Turdus philomelos (A)
Redwing, Turdus iliacus
Eurasian blackbird, Turdus merula
American robin, Turdus migratorius (A)
Fieldfare, Turdus pilaris
Ring ouzel, Turdus torquatus (A)
Black-throated thrush, Turdus atrogularis (A)

Old World flycatchers
Order: PasseriformesFamily: Muscicapidae

Old World flycatchers are a large group of birds which are mainly small arboreal insectivores. The appearance of these birds is highly varied, but they mostly have weak songs and harsh calls.

Dark-sided flycatcher, Muscicapa sibirica (A)
Spotted flycatcher, Muscicapa striata (A)
European robin, Erithacus rubecula (A)
Thrush nightingale, Luscinia luscinia (A)
Common nightingale, Luscinia megarhynchos (A)
Bluethroat, Luscinia svecica (A)
Siberian rubythroat, Calliope calliope (A)
Red-flanked bluetail, Tarsiger cyanurus (A)
Red-breasted flycatcher, Ficedula parva (A)
European pied flycatcher, Ficedula hypoleuca (A)
Common redstart, Phoenicurus phoenicurus (A)
Black redstart, Phoenicurus ochruros (A)
Whinchat, Saxicola rubetra (A)
European stonechat, Saxicola rubicola (A)
Siberian stonechat, Saxicola maurus (A)
Northern wheatear, Oenanthe oenanthe

Waxwings
Order: PasseriformesFamily: Bombycillidae

The waxwings are a group of birds with soft silky plumage and unique red tips to some of the wing feathers. In the Bohemian and cedar waxwings, these tips look like sealing wax and give the group its name. These are arboreal birds of northern forests. They live on insects in summer and berries in winter.

Bohemian waxwing, Bombycilla garrulus (A)
Cedar waxwing, Bombycilla cedrorum (A)

Accentors
Order: PasseriformesFamily: Prunellidae

The accentors are the only bird family which is endemic to the Palearctic. They are small, fairly drab species superficially similar to sparrows.

Dunnock, Prunella modularis (A)

Old World sparrows
Order: PasseriformesFamily: Passeridae

In general, Old World sparrows tend to be small, plump, brown or gray birds with short tails and short powerful beaks. Sparrows are seed eaters, but they also consume small insects.

House sparrow, Passer domesticus (A)
Eurasian tree sparrow, Passer montanus (A)

Wagtails and pipits
Order: PasseriformesFamily: Motacillidae

Motacillidae is a family of small birds with medium to long tails which includes the wagtails, longclaws, and pipits. They are slender ground-feeding insectivores of open country.

Gray wagtail, Motacilla cinerea (A)
Western yellow wagtail, Motacilla flava (A)
Eastern yellow wagtail, Motacilla tschutschensis (A)
Citrine wagtail, Motacilla citreola (A)
White wagtail, Motacilla alba
Tawny pipit, Anthus campestris (A)
Meadow pipit, Anthus pratensis
Tree pipit, Anthus trivialis (A)
Olive-backed pipit, Anthus hodgsoni (A)
Pechora pipit, Anthus gustavi (A)
Rock pipit, Anthus petrosus (A)
American pipit, Anthus rubescens (A)

Finches, euphonias, and allies
Order: PasseriformesFamily: Fringillidae

Finches are seed-eating birds that are small to moderately large and have a strong beak, usually conical and in some species very large. All have twelve tail feathers and nine primaries. These birds have a bouncing flight with alternating bouts of flapping and gliding on closed wings, and most sing well.

Common chaffinch, Fringilla coelebs (A)
Brambling, Fringilla montifringilla (A)
Hawfinch, Coccothraustes coccothraustes (A)
Common rosefinch, Carpodacus erythrinus (A)
Eurasian bullfinch, Pyrrhula pyrrhula (A)
European greenfinch, Chloris chloris (A)
Eurasian linnet, Linaria cannabina (A)
Common redpoll, Acanthis flammea
Lesser redpoll, Acanthis cabaret (A)
Hoary redpoll, Acanthis hornemanni (A)
Parrot crossbill, Loxia pytyopsittacus (A)
Red crossbill, Loxia curvirostra (A)
White-winged crossbill, Loxia leucoptera (A)
European goldfinch, Carduelis carduelis (A)
Eurasian siskin, Spinus spinus (A)

Longspurs and snow buntings
Order: PasseriformesFamily: Calcariidae

The Calcariidae are a family of birds that had been traditionally grouped with the New World sparrows, but differ in a number of respects and are usually found in open grassy areas.

Lapland longspur, Calcarius lapponicus (A)
Snow bunting, Plectrophenax nivalis

Old World buntings
Order: PasseriformesFamily: Emberizidae

Emberizidae is a family of passerine birds containing a single genus. Until 2017, the New World sparrows (Passerellidae) were also considered part of this family.

Black-headed bunting, Emberiza melanocephala (A)
Yellowhammer, Emberiza citrinella (A)
Pine bunting, Emberiza leucocephalos (A)
Ortolan bunting, Emberiza hortulana (A)
Reed bunting, Emberiza schoeniclus (A)
Yellow-breasted bunting, Emberiza aureola (A)
Little bunting, Emberiza pusilla (A)
Rustic bunting, Emberiza rustica (A)

New World sparrows
Order: PasseriformesFamily: Passerellidae

Until 2017, these species were considered part of the family Emberizidae. Most of the species are known as sparrows, but these birds are not closely related to the Old World sparrows which are in the family Passeridae. Many of these have distinctive head patterns.

Fox sparrow, Passerella iliaca (A)
Dark-eyed junco, Junco hyemalis (A)
White-crowned sparrow, Zonotrichia leucophrys (A)
White-throated sparrow, Zonotrichia albicollis (A)
Lincoln's sparrow, Melospiza lincolnii (A)

Troupials and allies
Order: PasseriformesFamily: Icteridae

The icterids are a group of small to medium-sized, often colorful passerine birds restricted to the New World and include the grackles, New World blackbirds, and New World orioles. Most species have black as a predominant plumage color, often enlivened by yellow, orange, or red.

Yellow-headed blackbird, Xanthocephalus xanthocephalus (A)
Baltimore oriole, Icterus galbula (A)

New World warblers
Order: PasseriformesFamily: Parulidae

Parulidae are a group of small, often colorful birds restricted to the New World. Most are arboreal and insectivorous. 

Black-and-white warbler, Mniotilta varia (A)
Prothonotary warbler, Protonotaria citrea (A)
Tennessee warbler, Oreothlypis peregrina (A)
Common yellowthroat, Geothlypis trichas (A)
American redstart, Setophaga ruticilla (A)
Cape May warbler, Setophaga tigrina (A)
Cerulean warbler, Setophaga cerulea (A)
Northern parula, Setophaga americana (A)
Magnolia warbler, Setophaga magnolia (A)
Blackburnian warbler, Setophaga fusca (A)
Yellow warbler, Setophaga petechia (A)
Blackpoll warbler, Setophaga striata (A)
Black-throated blue warbler, Setophaga caerulescens (A)
Palm warbler, Setophaga palmarum (A)
Yellow-rumped warbler, Setophaga coronata (A)
Black-throated green warbler, Setophaga virens (A)
Canada warbler, Cardellina canadensis (A)

Cardinals and allies
Order: PasseriformesFamily: Cardinalidae

The cardinals are a family of robust seed-eating birds with strong bills. They are typically associated with open woodland. The sexes usually have distinct plumage

Scarlet tanager, Piranga olivacea (A)
Rose-breasted grosbeak, Pheucticus ludovicianus (A)
Indigo bunting, Passerina cyanea (A)

See also
 List of birds
 Lists of birds by region

References

Iceland
Iceland
birds
'